The 2013–14 Georgia Bulldogs basketball team represented the University of Georgia during the 2013–14 NCAA Division I men's basketball season. The team's head coach was Mark Fox, who was in his fifth season at UGA. They played their home games at Stegeman Coliseum and were members of the Southeastern Conference.

Before the season

Departures

Recruits

Season

Preseason
Georgia's schedule was released in August 2013. Key non-conference games included a trip to the Charleston Classic as well as a road date against Colorado. In SEC play, the Bulldogs' schedule was highlighted by visits from LSU and Alabama to Athens, as well as travelling to Rupp Arena to play Kentucky.

Roster

Schedule and results

|-
!colspan=9 style="background:#000000; color:#A0000B;"| Exhibition

|-
!colspan=9 style="background:#000000; color:#A0000B;"| Non-conference games

|-
!colspan=9 style="background:#000000; color:#A0000B;"| Conference games

|-
!colspan=9 style="background:#000000; color:#A0000B;"| SEC tournament

|-
!colspan=9 style="background:#000000; color:#A0000B;"| NIT

See also
2013–14 Georgia Lady Bulldogs basketball team

References

Georgia Bulldogs basketball seasons
Georgia
Georgia
Bulldogs
Bulldogs